SciRes Literature LLC is a publisher of academic journals. It has a postal address in Middletown, Delaware, US, but is actually based in Hyderabad, India. It started its acivities in 2015. The company uses an Open Access model of publishing, which charges the authors. Articles are distributed online and free of cost or other barriers. As of October 2022, none of its journals names a scientific editor-in-chief.

Criticism 
SciRes Literature was criticized for sending unsolicited emails to scientists. Its Journal of Biomedical Research & Environmental Sciences was criticized for presenting a misleading impact factor, as the impact factor reported is not identical with the highly regarded ISI impact factor from Web of Science. SciRes Literature has also been criticized for using journal titles which mimic the names of established, indexed scientific journals. The company has been included on Beall's List of potential predatory open-access publishers.

Journals

References

Academic publishing companies
Open access publishers
Companies based in Hyderabad, India